Magnús Ólafsson (born 16 September 1967) is an Icelandic freestyle swimmer. He competed in three events at the 1988 Summer Olympics.

References

External links
 

1967 births
Living people
Magnus Olafsson
Magnus Olafsson
Swimmers at the 1988 Summer Olympics
Place of birth missing (living people)